Eric Lloyd Murdock (born June 14, 1968) is an American former professional basketball player who was selected by the Utah Jazz in the first round (21st pick overall) of the 1991 NBA draft.

Biography 
Murdock grew up in Bridgewater Township, New Jersey, where his mother was hit and killed by a reckless driver when he was less than one year old. He played high school basketball at Bridgewater-Raritan High School West.

A 6'1" point guard, Murdock then played at Providence College, and held several school records at the time of his graduation, including most career steals (376, also an NCAA record that held until 2002), most points in conference games in a season (435, also a Big East record), most points in a game (48, another Big East record) and most free throws in a season (238). His skills at PC earned him the nickname "EMT" standing for Eric Murdock Time.   Murdock played 9 seasons in the NBA from 1991 to 2000. He played for the Jazz, Milwaukee Bucks, Vancouver Grizzlies, Denver Nuggets, Miami Heat, New Jersey Nets and Los Angeles Clippers.

His best year as a pro came during the 1993–94 season as a member of the Bucks, appearing in 82 games (76 starts) and averaging 15.3 ppg. That same year, he ranked 6th in three-point percentage in the league. The following preseason, while only 26 years old, his career was derailed by an eye injury. Though he recovered later that season, he lost playing time to Lee Mayberry, and never seemed to play as well again upon being traded to the Grizzlies.
In his NBA career, Murdock played in 508 games and scored a total of 5,118 points.

He has also played in Italy for Teamsystem Bologna (1996–1997, reached the Italian Championship finals) and Virtus Bologna (2002–2003).

On April 2, 1994, in a game against the Washington Bullets, Murdock stole the ball nine times.

On January 24, 1995, in a game against the Houston Rockets, Murdock scored a 75-footer at the buzzer in the third quarter.

From 2010 to 2012, Murdock served as the director of basketball player development for Rutgers University, working with Rutgers coach Mike Rice. He was fired in July 2012. After his dismissal, Murdock acted as a whistleblower by showing recordings of Rice launching homophobic slurs to players to Rutgers athletic director Tim Pernetti in late 2012, leading to the eventual firing of Rice and the resignation of Pernetti in April 2013. In 2016, Rutgers settled Murdock's wrongful termination lawsuit for $500,000.

In December 2018, Murdock and a fellow airplane passenger filed a federal civil rights lawsuit against United Airlines over alleged racial discrimination and false imprisonment.

Murdock's cousin, Jason Murdock, played college basketball at Providence, as well, from 1993 to 1997.

Career statistics

NBA

Regular season

|-
| align="left" | 1991–92
| align="left" | Utah
| 50 || 0 || 9.6 || .415 || .192 || .754 || 1.1 || 1.8 || 0.6 || 0.1 || 4.1
|-
| align="left" | 1992–93
| align="left" | Milwaukee
| 79 || 78 || 30.8 || .468 || .261 || .780 || 3.6 || 7.6 || 2.2 || 0.1 || 14.4
|-
| align="left" | 1993–94
| align="left" | Milwaukee
| style="background:#cfecec;"| 82* || 76 || 30.9 || .468 || .411 || .813 || 3.2 || 6.7 || 2.4 || 0.1 || 15.3
|-
| align="left" | 1994–95
| align="left" | Milwaukee
| 75 || 32 || 28.8 || .415 || .375 || .790 || 2.9 || 6.4 || 1.5 || 0.2 || 13.0
|-
| align="left" | 1995–96
| align="left" | Milwaukee
| 9 || 0 || 21.4 || .364 || .261 || .667 || 1.6 || 3.9 || 0.7 || 0.0 || 6.9
|-
| align="left" | 1995–96
| align="left" | Vancouver
| 64 || 14 || 23.1 || .422 || .320 || .809 || 2.4 || 4.6 || 2.0 || 0.1 || 9.1
|-
| align="left" | 1996–97
| align="left" | Denver
| 12 || 0 || 9.5 || .455 || .400 || .917 || 0.9 || 2.0 || 0.8 || 0.2 || 3.8
|-
| align="left" | 1997–98
| align="left" | Miami
| style="background:#cfecec;"| 82* || 1 || 17.0 || .422 || .308 || .801 || 1.9 || 2.7 || 1.3 || 0.2 || 6.2
|-
| align="left" | 1998–99
| align="left" | New Jersey
| 15 || 8 || 26.7 || .395 || .364 || .808 || 2.3 || 4.4 || 1.5 || 0.1 || 7.9
|-
| align="left" | 1999–00
| align="left" | L.A. Clippers
| 40 || 15 || 17.3 || .385 || .381 || .638 || 1.9 || 2.7 || 1.2 || 0.1 || 5.6
|- class="sortbottom"
| style="text-align:center;" colspan="2"| Career
| 508 || 224 || 23.4 || .438 || .343 || .786 || 2.5 || 4.9 || 1.6 || 0.1 || 10.1
|}

Playoffs

|-
| align="left" | 1991–92
| align="left" | Utah
| 3 || 0 || 3.7 || .600 || .000 || 1.000 || 1.0 || 0.3 || 0.3 || 0.3 || 2.7
|-
| align="left" | 1997–98
| align="left" | Miami
| 5 || 0 || 25.0 || .344 || .222 || .821 || 4.0 || 3.0 || 1.4 || 0.0 || 9.4
|- class="sortbottom"
| style="text-align:center;" colspan="2"| Career
| 8 || 0 || 17.0 || .378 || .200 || .833 || 2.9 || 2.0 || 1.0 || 0.1 || 6.9
|}

College

|-
| align="left" | 1987–88
| align="left" | Providence
| 28 || - || 27.4 || .413 || .355 || .738 || 3.0 || 3.0 || 3.2 || 0.1 || 10.7
|-
| align="left" | 1988–89
| align="left" | Providence
| 29 || - || 32.3 || .457 || .349 || .762 || 4.7 || 4.7 || 3.3 || 0.3 || 16.2
|-
| align="left" | 1989–90
| align="left" | Providence
| 28 || - || 29.8 || .419 || .365 || .762 || 4.1 || 4.1 || 2.8 || 0.5 || 15.4
|-
| align="left" | 1990–91
| align="left" | Providence
| 32 || - || 34.7 || .445 || .350 || .812 || 5.3 || 5.3 || 3.5 || 0.2 || 25.6
|- class="sortbottom"
| style="text-align:center;" colspan="2"| Career
| 117 || - || 31.2 || .436 || .354 || .784 || 4.3 || 4.3 || 3.2 || 0.3 || 17.3
|}

See also
 List of NCAA Division I men's basketball career steals leaders
 List of National Basketball Association players with 9 or more steals in a game

References 

1968 births
Living people
African-American basketball players
All-American college men's basketball players
American expatriate basketball people in Canada
American expatriate basketball people in Italy
American men's basketball players
American whistleblowers
Basketball players from New Jersey
Bridgewater-Raritan High School alumni
Denver Nuggets players
Fortitudo Pallacanestro Bologna players
Grand Rapids Hoops players
Idaho Stampede (CBA) players
Los Angeles Clippers players
Miami Heat players
Milwaukee Bucks players
New Jersey Nets players
People from Bridgewater Township, New Jersey
Point guards
Providence Friars men's basketball players
Sportspeople from Somerville, New Jersey
Utah Jazz draft picks
Utah Jazz players
Vancouver Grizzlies players
21st-century African-American people
20th-century African-American sportspeople